The Butler Street Gatehouse at Allegheny Cemetery in Pittsburgh, Pennsylvania was built 1848 in the Gothic Revival style by John Chislett, Pittsburgh's first well-known architect and the founder of the cemetery. A chapel and offices, designed by Henry Moser, were added in 1870.

The gatehouse was listed on the National Register of Historic Places in 1974. The entire Allegheny Cemetery was listed on the National Register in 1980.

References

External links

Historic American Landscapes Survey (HALS) documentation:
HALS No. PA-3-B, "Allegheny Cemetery, Butler Street Gate House" (incomplete)

Buildings and structures on the National Register of Historic Places in Pennsylvania
Gothic Revival architecture in Pennsylvania
Infrastructure completed in 1848
Cemeteries in Pittsburgh
National Register of Historic Places in Pittsburgh
Lawrenceville (Pittsburgh)